Joey Walton (born 27 May 2000 in Australia) is an Australian rugby union player who plays for the NSW Waratahs in Super Rugby. His playing position is centre. He has signed to the Waratahs squad for the 2020 season.

Walton signed for Bay of Plenty for the 2022 National Provincial Championship.

Reference list

External links
Rugby.com.au profile
itsrugby.co.uk profile

2000 births
Australian rugby union players
Living people
Rugby union centres
New South Wales Waratahs players
New South Wales Country Eagles players
Bay of Plenty rugby union players